Cuckoo-hawk may refer to either of two bird species:

 African cuckoo-hawk
 Madagascar cuckoo-hawk

See also
 Hawk-cuckoo

Animal common name disambiguation pages